Clint Mitchell (born September 21, 1980) is a former American college and professional football player who was a defensive end in the National Football League (NFL) and two other professional leagues during the early 2000s.  Mitchell played college football for the University of Florida, and thereafter, he played professionally for the Denver Broncos and Kansas City Chiefs of the NFL and the Tampa Bay Storm of the Arena Football League.

Early years 

Mitchell was born in Austin, Texas in 1980.  He attended Countryside High School in Clearwater, Florida, where he played high school football for the Countryside Cougars.

College career 

Mitchell received an athletic scholarship to attend the University of Florida in Gainesville, Florida, where he played for coach Steve Spurrier and coach Ron Zook's Florida Gators football teams from 1999 to 2002.  He was an honorable mention All-Southeastern Conference (SEC) selection at defensive end in 2002.

Professional career 

The Denver Broncos selected Mitchell in the seventh round (227th pick overall) of the 2003 NFL Draft, and he played one season for the Broncos in 2003.  He also played for the Amsterdam Admirals in 2005 and the Tampa Bay Storm in 2007.

See also 

List of Florida Gators in the NFL Draft

References

Bibliography 
Carlson, Norm, University of Florida Football Vault: The History of the Florida Gators, Whitman Publishing, LLC, Atlanta, Georgia (2007).  .
Golenbock, Peter, Go Gators!  An Oral History of Florida's Pursuit of Gridiron Glory, Legends Publishing, LLC, St. Petersburg, Florida (2002).  .
Hairston, Jack, Tales from the Gator Swamp: A Collection of the Greatest Gator Stories Ever Told, Sports Publishing, LLC, Champaign, Illinois (2002).  .

1980 births
Living people
Players of American football from Austin, Texas
Players of American football from Florida
American football defensive ends
Florida Gators football players
Denver Broncos players
Amsterdam Admirals players
Kansas City Chiefs players
Tampa Bay Storm players